Christian Heffernan (born June 15, 1978, in London, Ontario) is a former professional Canadian football wide receiver who played for the Toronto Argonauts of the Canadian Football League.  Heffernan played CIS football for the Western Ontario Mustangs. Heffernan is now the Senior House Advisor of Wedd's House at Upper Canada College. He also teaches mathematics and coaches the varsity football and Basketball team. He also played Major League Baseball in the Atlanta Braves farm system for 4 seasons.

Further reading 

Living people
1978 births
Sportspeople from London, Ontario
Players of Canadian football from Ontario
Western Mustangs football players
Toronto Argonauts players